Chad Gibson (born 19 June 1976) is a former professional footballer.

Biography
Chad Gibson is from Sydney, Australia, with parents of South African origin who migrated to Australia during Apartheid due to racial policies, which legally forbid their relationship. Gibson is an ex-professional footballer who is a versatile player having played professionally from defence to the mid-field. He began his professional career with Sydney United, who played in the now defunct National Soccer League. After moving to Marconi Stallions, he played a season for Johor FC in Malaysia and another season with FK Bodø/Glimt in Norway, before returning to Australia to play for Marconi Stallions. He joined the Queensland Roar as the club's first ever captain, and a face of the A-League, appearing heavily in the A-League advertisement campaign. In 2006, Gibson retired from professional football after two seasons of the A-League and a career that spanned over 12 years and over 200 professional games.

The former A-League Captain continued to play for one season in the division below the A-League, where he won the NSW Premier League Championship in 2007 with Blacktown City Demons where he scored the match winning goal in his final official game. In 2008 he joined NSW State League Division 1 side, Stanmore Hawks. He returned to playing park football with various clubs and later signed on for Joeys FC United in the New England Mutual Premier League in a mentoring role to the young team, giving back to rural Australian football. Gibson now plays again for his first ever junior club, Belmore Eagles, alongside his father on the pitch, as recently reported by Football NSW.

Gibson is currently a Creative Director and Sports Photographer.

Honours
With Stanmore Hawks
  NSW Super League Championship: 2004

With Blacktown City Demons
 NSW Premier League Championship: 2007
 NSW Premier League Premiership: 2007

References

1976 births
Living people
Soccer players from Sydney
Association football sweepers
Australian expatriate soccer players
Expatriate footballers in Norway
Australian expatriate sportspeople in Norway
Olympic soccer players of Australia
Footballers at the 1992 Summer Olympics
A-League Men players
National Soccer League (Australia) players
Eliteserien players
Blacktown City FC players
Marconi Stallions FC players
Brisbane Roar FC players
Sydney United 58 FC players
Bankstown City FC players
FK Bodø/Glimt players
Australian soccer players